Apantesis nais, the Nais tiger moth, is a moth of the family Erebidae. It was described by Dru Drury in 1773.

Description
Forewings are mostly black with cream-colored costal border and lines extending from base in males. Hindwings are variable in color but usually they are reddish or yellow and show a row of large black spots in median area. Females have a quite reduced set of pale lines on the forewings and the hindwings have broad black bands in the subterminal area.

Adults are on wing from April to October. The larvae feed on a wide range of herbaceous and woody plants, including grasses, violets, plantain and clover.

Distribution and habitat
This species can be found in North America from Quebec and Maine south to Florida and west to Texas and South Dakota. It has also been spotted in Ohio. It prefers woodlands and forested habitats.

References

External links

 NYPL Digital Gallery

Moths described in 1773
Arctiina
Moths of North America
Taxa named by Dru Drury